Alejo Antilef (born 20 July 1998) is an Argentine professional footballer who plays as a midfielder for Unión La Calera.

Career
Antilef began his career in J. J. Moreno's ranks, before joining Arsenal de Sarandí in 2013 following a trial. Sergio Rondina promoted Antilef into his first-team squad in January 2018, selecting him for his professional debut on 27 January against Newell's Old Boys; a game in which Antilef also scored his first senior goal during a 2–1 defeat at the Estadio Marcelo Bielsa. One goal, against Rosario Central in May, in twelve appearances followed in 2017–18 as Arsenal were relegated.

Career statistics
.

References

External links

1998 births
Living people
People from Chubut Province
Argentine people of Mapuche descent
Argentine footballers
Association football midfielders
Argentine Primera División players
Primera Nacional players
Arsenal de Sarandí footballers